Khaneqah Juju (also Romanized as Khāneqāh Jūjū, Khānaqāh-e Jūju, Khāneqāh-e Jūjū; also known as Khāngeh and Khanjeh) is a village in Negel Rural District, Kalatrazan District, Sanandaj County, Kurdistan Province, Iran. At the 2006 census, its population was 111, in 23 families. The village is populated by Kurds.

References 

Towns and villages in Sanandaj County
Kurdish settlements in Kurdistan Province